Jean Sévillia (born in Paris on September 14, 1952) is a conservative French journalist and essayist. He is known for writings in Le Figaro Magazine. His defense of the Roman Catholic Church's role in history has made him popular from traditionalist and ultraconservative organisations in France. He is critical of what he perceives to be left wing bias in the media that often influence popular beliefs on history.

External links 
Official site

French journalists
French people of Spanish descent
20th-century French historians
French Roman Catholics
1952 births
Living people
French male non-fiction writers
21st-century French historians